Lucas Santos da Silva, known as Lucas Santos or Lucas Silva (born 7 March 1999) is a Brazilian soccer player who plays as an attacking midfielder or a winger for Portuguesa-RJ, on loan from Tombense.

Club career
He made his professional debut in the Campeonato Carioca for Vasco da Gama on 24 January 2018 in a game against Cabofriense, replacing Bruno Paulista in the 75th minute.

On 2 September 2019, he signed with Russian club PFC CSKA Moscow on loan until the end of 2019, with CSKA holding an option to buy out his rights at the end of the loan. He made his Russian Premier League debut for CSKA on 15 September 2019 in a game against FC Tambov, replacing Konstantin Kuchayev in the 79th minute. On 10 January 2020, CSKA Moscow confirmed that Santos had returned to Vasco da Gama after his loan had expired.

Career statistics

Club

References

External links
 
 

1999 births
Footballers from Rio de Janeiro (city)
Living people
Brazilian footballers
Association football midfielders
CR Vasco da Gama players
Grêmio Esportivo Brasil players
Tombense Futebol Clube players
PFC CSKA Moscow players
Campeonato Brasileiro Série A players
Campeonato Brasileiro Série B players
Russian Premier League players
Brazilian expatriate footballers
Expatriate footballers in Russia
Brazilian expatriate sportspeople in Russia